The Launderettes is an all girl garage rock band from Oslo, Norway. The band has been around since 1996, and over the years they have toured both the US and Europe, and released several albums and singles. Since 2007, the band has been signed to Steven Van Zandt's label, Wicked Cool Records.

Members

Discography

Albums
 Shaken And Disturbed (Big Dipper, 2002)
 Take Me To The Race EP (Big Dipper, 2003)
 Fluff 'N' Fold – The Best Of The Launderettes (Wicked Cool Records, 2007)
 Getaway (Wicked Cool Records, 2013)

EP's
 Every Heart Is A Time Bomb (Big Dipper, 2005)

Singles
 Rebel Love (Sneakers Records, 2000)
 I Wanna Jump Your Bones (Thunderbaby Records, 2000)
 Live at Tikis (Launderama Records, 2001)
 Devil Dolls Tour 2001 (Low Impact Records, 2002)
 Red River (Wicked Cool Records, 2011)
 The Beat Dropped (Wicked Cool Records, 2011)
 Marks On My Map (Wicked Cool Records, 2012)

Compilations
 Kraftrock 96 (Viking Media, 1996)
 Riot on the Rocks (Safety Pin Records, 1999)
 Stiff Nipples Vol.2 (Stiff Nipples Records, 1999)
 A Fistful of Rock'n'Roll Vol.7 (Tee Pee Records, 2001)
 Pushing Scandinavian Rock to the Man Vol. 3 (Bad Afro Records, 2002)
 The Coolest Songs in the World Vol.5 (Wicked Cool Records, 2008)

Related Bands 
Linda Kastbakken (alias Linderella) is the lead singer and guitarist in the all-girl power trio The High Tension Girls along with drummer Plingis from Mensen and bassist Lucky Lise from The Pumps (Oslo).

References

 [ Review of Fluff'n'Fold at Allmusic.com]
 The Launderettes on Wicked Cool Records
 Little Steven announces new The Launderettes record
 The Launderettes releaseparty in New York City

External links
 Official Website

Norwegian rock music groups
Norwegian garage rock groups
All-female bands
Musical groups established in 1996
1996 establishments in Norway
Musical groups from Norway with local place of origin missing
Women in Norway